A spherical cone may mean:
 a hypercone in 4D
 a spherical sector in 3D

See also
Spherical conic